Prison on Fire – Life Sentence is a 2001 Hong Kong crime thriller film directed by Edmond Yuen and starring Ben Wong, Iris Wong, Tommy Wong, William Ho, Lee Wai-kei, Chapman To and Bill Lung. Despite the title, this film is not related to the 1987 film Prison on Fire and its 1991 sequel.

Plot 
A group of prisoners were doing a variety of activities on the courtyard. Big Fool (William Ho) and Crazy Bill (Tommy Wong) were playing basketball where Bill kicks the ball towards Tung (Ben Wong), who kicks it away. Bill felt humiliated by it and stars a fight with Tung where Tung ends out hospitalized. During hospitalization, Tung thinks about the time when his family moved to another house and opened a food stall nearby. However, their stall was burnt by triad leader Sing (Bill Lung), who constantly bullies Tung's family and also raped Tung's girlfriend, Sau (Iris Wong). Unable to tolerate Sing's bullying, Tung kills Sing by chopping him to death, which leads Tung to being imprisoned.

Cast 
 Ben Wong as Ho Sun-tung (何順東)
 Iris Wong as Sau (秀)
 Tommy Wong as Crazy Bill (傻標)
 William Ho as Big Fool (大傻)
 Lee Wai-kei
 Chapman To
 Bill Lung as Brother Sing (大哥成)
 Wong Hok-lam
 Tony Chiu

Reception

Critical 
Hong Kong Film Net  gave the film a score of 6.5/10 noting the unoriginal plot, but also praising it as a decent triad film that makes a good contrast to the Hollywood inspired Hong Kong films coming out that period despite its low budget.

Box office 
The film grossed HK$18,240 at the Hong Kong box office during its theatrical run from 8 to 14 March 2001 in Hong Kong.

References

External links 
 
 Prison on Fire – Life Sentence at Hong Kong Cinemagic
 

2001 films
2001 crime thriller films
2000s crime drama films
2001 action thriller films
Hong Kong crime thriller films
Hong Kong action thriller films
Triad films
2000s prison films
2000s Cantonese-language films
Films set in Hong Kong
Films shot in Hong Kong
2001 drama films
Hong Kong prison films
2000s Hong Kong films